The 1950–51 Panhellenic Championship was the 16th season of the highest football league of Greece. The clubs that participated were the champions from the 3 founding football associations of the HFF: Athens, Piraeus and Macedonia.Olympiacos easily won the championship, in an undefeated run, winning all 4 games. The point system was: Win: 3 points - Draw: 2 points - Loss: 1 point.

Qualification round

Athens Football Clubs Association

Piraeus Football Clubs Association

Macedonia Football Clubs Association

Final round

League table

Top scorers

External links
Rsssf, 1950-51 championship

Panhellenic Championship seasons
1950–51 in Greek football
Greek